John Finley Williamson (June 23, 1887 in Canton, Ohio – May 28, 1964 in Toledo, Ohio) was the founder of Westminster Choir and co-founder of Westminster Choir College. He is considered to be one of the most influential choral conductors of the twentieth century. He was described by The New York Times as the "dean of American choral directors." He was a 1925 initiate of the Alpha Theta chapter of Phi Mu Alpha Sinfonia fraternity, the national fraternity for men in music, at Miami University.

Westminster
In 1920 Williamson founded the Westminster Choir in 1920 at the Westminster Presbyterian Church of Dayton, Ohio. In 1926, he also founded the Westminster Choir School.

In 1929 the School and   the Choir   moved to Ithaca College in Ithaca, New York State in 1929; in 1932 they moved to   Princeton, New Jersey

Williamson retired as President of  the  College in 1958;  He died suddenly   in 1964.

References

External links
 The Daily Princetonian: Westminster Choir College

1887 births
1964 deaths
American music educators
American choral conductors
American male conductors (music)
Rider University faculty
Classical musicians from Ohio
20th-century American conductors (music)
20th-century American male musicians